Ega Rizky Pramana (born 23 August 1992) is an Indonesian professional footballer who plays as a goalkeeper for Liga 1 club PSS Sleman.

Honours

Club
PSCS Cilacap
 Indonesia Soccer Championship B: 2016
PSS Sleman
 Liga 2: 2018
Menpora Cup third place: 2021

References

External links 
 
 Ega Rizky at Liga Indonesia

1992 births
Living people
Indonesian footballers
Indonesian Premier Division players
Liga 2 (Indonesia) players
Liga 1 (Indonesia) players
PSCS Cilacap players
PSIS Semarang players
PSS Sleman players
Association football goalkeepers
People from Banyumas Regency
Sportspeople from Central Java